Aaron Freeman, better known by his stage name Gene Ween, is an American singer, guitarist and a founding member of the experimental alternative rock group Ween. Freeman, along with childhood friend Dean Ween (Mickey Melchiondo), started the group in the mid-1980s.

Freeman announced his departure from Ween in 2012, shortly after releasing Marvelous Clouds, his first solo album. After leaving Ween, he stopped using the name Gene Ween and performed under his birth name Aaron Freeman. In 2014 he formed a new five-piece band called Freeman.

In 2015, Freeman returned to using the Gene Ween name for his "Gene Ween Does Billy Joel" concerts, saying it was a positive thing:

In November 2015, Ween announced a February 2016 reunion for three shows in Colorado, with later dates subsequently announced.

Career 

Freeman and Melchiondo met in an eighth grade typing class in 1984, in New Hope, Bucks County, Pennsylvania, where they both grew up. Both of them talked about bands they liked and playing their own music. Soon, they hung out and began jamming, recording most of what they put together. Ween's music slowly progressed from a bedroom-style recording project, eventually signing to a major record label and transforming into a full live band.

In May 2012, Freeman suddenly announced his departure from Ween, as an attempt to rehabilitate himself after years of drug and alcohol abuse, which peaked during Ween's 2011 tour.

Even before his departure from Ween, Freeman had maintained a solo career. He has performed solo concerts with artists such as Jon Anderson of Yes. Around 2008, Freeman launched the Gene Ween Band, where he plays alongside Ween bassist Dave Dreiwitz,  and with guitarist Scott Metzger and drummer Joe Russo. In 2012, he released Marvelous Clouds, his first solo album under the name Aaron Freeman. The album consisted entirely of cover versions of Rod McKuen songs.

In 2014, Freeman formed a new full band called Freeman and released an eponymous album of original material with them in August of that year. He continues to tour with Freeman, as well as perform acoustic shows accompanied by Freeman bassist Joe Young.

In 2015, Freeman announced he would be fronting a Billy Joel tribute band that would feature, among others Paul Green and Dan Hickey. Two shows under the banner "Gene Ween Does Billy Joel" are scheduled for Woodstock and Brooklyn.

On May 22, 2015, Freeman joined Umphrey's McGee onstage at the Summer Camp Music Festival under the name 'Godboner' for a set of Ween covers. Freeman was billed as 'Gene Ween' for this appearance.

On November 16, 2015, Ween announced that they would reunite for three concerts at the 1stBank Center in Broomfield, Colorado in February 2016. Ween has continued to play and tour since.

Personal life 
Aaron Freeman lives with his wife Leah Ben-Ari and their son. Freeman has another child from a previous relationship, Ashton Freeman, born in 1998.

Freeman has talked about drug use, but does not often divulge specifics. He spoke openly and in detail about his personal life, drug use, and time spent in Ween on the WTF with Marc Maron podcast (episode 309).

Freeman has lived and recorded at his home in Lambertville, New Jersey.

Selected discography 
With Ween
GodWeenSatan: The Oneness (1990)
The Pod (1991)
Pure Guava (1992)
Chocolate and Cheese (1994)
12 Golden Country Greats (1996)
The Mollusk (1997)
White Pepper (2000)
Quebec (2003)
Shinola, Vol. 1 (2005)
La Cucaracha (2007)

With Z-Rock Hawaii
Z-Rock Hawaii (1997)

With Freeman
 Freeman (2014)

Solo work
Synthetic Socks (1987)
Marvelous Clouds (2012) (released as Aaron Freeman)
Gener's Gone: The Final Demo Recordings of Gene Ween (2013) (released as Aaron Freeman)

References 

Living people
Place of birth missing (living people)
Ween members
Musicians from New Jersey
People from Lambertville, New Jersey
Year of birth missing (living people)